IDNNA (2,5-dimethoxy-4-iodo-N,N-dimethylamphetamine) is a lesser-known psychedelic drug and a substituted amphetamine. It is also the N,N-dimethyl analog of DOI. IDNNA was first synthesized by Alexander Shulgin. In his book PiHKAL, the minimum dosage is listed as 2.6 mg, and the duration unknown. IDNNA produces few to no effects. Very little data exists about the pharmacological properties, metabolism, and toxicity of IDNNA.

Legality

United Kingdom
This substance is a Class A drug in the Drugs controlled by the UK Misuse of Drugs Act.

See also 

 Phenethylamine
 Psychedelics, dissociatives and deliriants

References

Substituted amphetamines
Iodoarenes
Phenol ethers